Thysanodesma major is a moth in the family Crambidae. It was described by Arthur Gardiner Butler in 1889. It is found in Himachal Pradesh, India.

References

Moths described in 1889
Pyraustinae